The third season of SuperStar, premiered live on Rede Globo on Sunday, April 10, 2016 at 1 p.m. (BRT/AMT) during the 2016–17 Brazilian television season.
The winning band is entitled to a R$500,000 prize,  and a recording contract with Som Livre.

Host and experts

Hosts
Fernanda Lima returned as the host, and Rafa Brites as backstage interviewer.

Experts
Two experts (Paulo Ricardo and Sandy) returned for their second season and Thiaguinho was replaced by Daniela Mercury.

The auditions
 Key
  – Expert vote "Yes"
  – Expert vote "No"
  – Band reached + 70%, finished in the top 4 and advanced to the Playoffs
  – Band reached + 70%, finished out the top 4 and was sent to Wild Card
  – Band eliminated

Week 1
Aired: April 10, 2016
Running order

Week 2
Aired: April 17, 2016
Running order

Week 3
Aired: April 24, 2016
Running order

Week 4
Aired: May 1, 2016
Running order

Week 5: Wildcard
Aired: May 8, 2016
Running order

Playoffs

Week 6 
Aired: May 15, 2016

Key
  - Band advanced
  - Band eliminated

Running order

Week 7 
Aired: May 22, 2016
Running order

The solos

Elimination chart

Week 8 
Aired: May 29, 2016
Top 16 Perform

Week 9 
Aired: June 5, 2016
Top 12 Perform

Week 10 
Aired: June 12, 2016
Top 10 Perform

Week 11 
Aired: June 19, 2016
Top 8 - Semifinal

Week 12
Finale
Aired: June 26, 2016
Running order

Ratings and reception

Brazilian ratings
All numbers are in points and provided by IBOPE.

 In 2016, each point represents 69,417 households in São Paulo.

References

External links
SuperStar on GShow.com

Rising Star (franchise)
2016 Brazilian television seasons